KCP may refer to:

 Kentavious Caldwell-Pope (born 1993), American basketball player
 Khmer Communist Party, ruling party of Cambodia from 1975 to 1979
 Karnataka College of Percussion, music school in Bangalore, India
 Kennel Club of Pakistan
 Kochi City Police, India
 Kowloon City Plaza, shopping mall in Hong Kong
 Kangleipak Communist Party, political party in Manipur, India